Holocola zopherana is a species of moth in the family Tortricidae first described by Edward Meyrick in 1881. This species was previously placed in the genus Strepsicrates.  It is found in Australia and New Zealand.

References 

Moths described in 1881
Eucosmini
Moths of New Zealand
Moths of Australia
Taxa named by Edward Meyrick